Louisiana Highway 29 (LA 29) is a state highway located in southern Louisiana.  It runs  in a north–south direction from LA 13 north of Eunice to LA 114 west of Moreauville.

The route connects Eunice, a city in western St. Landry Parish, with Ville Platte, the seat of neighboring Evangeline Parish.  Here, LA 29 briefly overlaps U.S. Highway 167 (US 167) and LA 10 through the center of town.  North of Ville Platte, LA 29 crosses Interstate 49 (I-49) and parallels that highway toward Bunkie.  It then passes through a string of small rural towns, such as Evergreen and Cottonport, connecting the US 71 and LA 1 corridors in Avoyelles Parish.

LA 29 was designated in the 1955 Louisiana Highway renumbering, replacing portions of four former routes.  These included State Route 119, State Route 224, State Route 5, and State Route 30.  The portion of LA 29 between Cottonport and Long Bridge is scheduled to be eliminated from the state highway system in the future as part of the Louisiana Department of Transportation and Development (La DOTD) Road Transfer Program.

Route description

Eunice to Ville Platte
From the south, LA 29 begins at a junction with LA 13 just north of the Eunice city limits in extreme western St. Landry Parish.  It heads northeast as an undivided two-lane highway, and the surroundings quickly change from residential to rural farmland.  After crossing into Evangeline Parish, LA 29 turns due east through the village of Chataignier and overlaps LA 95 along Vine Street.  LA 29 resumes its northward course when LA 95 turns off to the south onto St. Julien Road.  LA 1165 laterals off of the highway with signs directing motorists toward the nearby city of Opelousas.  Passing near an area known as Point Blue, LA 29 has a brief concurrency with LA 104, which travels between Mamou to the west and Opelousas to the east.

LA 29 enters the city limits of Ville Platte, the parish seat, just north of LA 1161 (Pine Point Road).  The route follows South Chataignier Street to a junction with US 167/LA 10 at the edge of the business section.  US 167 and LA 10 follow the one-way pair of Main and LaSalle Streets through town.  LA 29 jogs eastward onto East Main Street for two blocks, overlapping the above highways, and thus becomes a divided four-lane highway briefly.  Southbound LA 29 traffic follows East LaSalle and North Chataignier Streets during this stretch.

Ville Platte to Avoyelles Parish
LA 29 heads out of Ville Platte after turning north onto Tate Cove Road.  Just beyond the city limits, the route zigzags onto a parallel road running east of Tate Cove and crosses back into St. Landry Parish about  later.  Immediately across the parish line, LA 29 passes through a diamond interchange with I-49 at exit 40, connecting with Opelousas and Alexandria.  The highway turns northwest at a T-intersection with LA 182 near Whiteville and proceeds into Avoyelles Parish.

LA 29 parallels the interstate northward for a few miles before entering the city of Bunkie.  During this stretch, the highway crosses the serpentine Bayou Boeuf several times and intersects LA 106, a connection to I-49.  Upon entering Bunkie, LA 29 follows Pershing Avenue to the center of town and a junction with US 71 (Southwest Main Street).  LA 29 turns northwest to follow US 71 for three blocks before turning northeast briefly onto East Church Street and across the Union Pacific Railroad (UP) tracks concurrent with LA 115.  The combined route then branches eastward onto Evergreen Street and passes the local hospital and high school complexes on the way out of Bunkie.  After LA 115 departs to the north toward Hessmer and Marksville, LA 29 continues through the small town of Evergreen.

The highway assumes a winding path along several bayous for the remainder of its journey.  Traveling along Front Street through the town of Cottonport, LA 29 takes on the character of a scenic route as it hugs a sharp bend in Bayou Rouge.  Beginning at Cottonport Avenue, the route also overlaps LA 107, another connection to Marksville as well as nearby Mansura.  After branching eastward from LA 107, LA 29 proceeds into the incorporated community of Long Bridge and reaches its northern terminus at a junction with LA 114 west of Moreauville.  LA 114 provides connections to LA 1, the main highway through the area.

Route classification and data
LA 29 has several different classifications over the course of its route, as determined by the Louisiana Department of Transportation and Development (La DOTD).  Most of the route between Eunice and Bunkie is classified as a rural major collector, with the remainder diminishing in importance from a rural minor arterial to a rural minor collector.  The short concurrency with US 167/LA 10 in Ville Platte is classified as an urban principal arterial.  Daily traffic volume in 2013 peaked at 17,100 vehicles in Ville Platte and 8,400 in Bunkie.  Most of the route averaged less than 5,000 vehicles per day, with a low of 880 reported south of Bunkie.  The posted speed limit is generally , reduced as low as  within the two cities.

Three portions of LA 29 are included in state-designated system of tourist routes known as the Louisiana Scenic Byways.  The first two are short sections south of Chataignier and Bunkie that are part of the Zydeco Cajun Prairie Byway and Northup Trail, respectively.  The third extends from Bunkie to the northern terminus near Moreauville and is part of the Louisiana Colonial Trails byway.

History
In the original Louisiana Highway system in use between 1921 and 1955, the modern LA 29 was part of four different routes: State Route 119 from Eunice to Ville Platte; State Route 224 to Whiteville; State Route 5 to Bunkie; and State Route 30 to Long Bridge.  These highways were joined together under the single designation of LA 29 when the Louisiana Department of Highways renumbered the state highway system in 1955.

With the 1955 renumbering, the state highway department initially categorized all routes into three classes: "A" (primary), "B" (secondary), and "C" (farm-to-market).  This system has since been updated and replaced by a more specific functional classification system.

As the above description indicates, the northern terminus at Long Bridge was originally a junction with LA 1.  In the mid-1960s, however, LA 1 was moved onto a new and straighter alignment through the area, and LA 114 was extended over the old route.  Small improvements have also been made to the alignment of LA 29 over the years.  In the early 1960s, a short section of the highway closely following the Texas and Pacific Railway (now the Acadiana Railway) was bypassed.  This eliminated a sharp turn across the rail line and allowed the highway to cross at a safer angle.  During the early 1970s, both LA 13 and LA 29 were straightened heading north from Eunice.  The junction of the two routes was originally located at the intersection of 2nd Street and Camelia Avenue.  LA 29 traveled north on 2nd Street, east on Dean Avenue, and north on Threatt Street to join the current alignment.  Finally, the highway was re-routed north of Ville Platte around 1988.  The original route traveled north on what is now LA 1171 to Tate Cove and turned southeast on LA 3247.  LA 29 was simply re-signed to follow what was then LA 363 east and LA 1170 north, creating a somewhat more direct routing.

Future
Under this plan of "right-sizing" the state highway system, the portion of LA 29 between Cottonport and Long Bridge is proposed for deletion as it no longer meets a significant interurban travel function.

Major intersections

Spur route

Louisiana Highway 29 Spur (LA 29 Spur) runs  in a north–south direction along North Chataignier Street in Ville Platte, the seat of Evangeline Parish.  It is a short connector between the travel lanes of the concurrent US 167/LA 10, which follows the one-way pair of Main and LaSalle Streets through town.

The route is signed as part of mainline LA 29, as it performs that function for certain traffic movements at the westernmost intersection of LA 29 and US 167/LA 10.  Its existence dates back to around 1982, when the one-way pair was put into effect, giving US 167/LA 10 a four-lane corridor through Ville Platte.

Major intersections

See also

Notes

References

External links

Maps / GIS Data Homepage, Louisiana Department of Transportation and Development
Louisiana Scenic Byways Homepage

0029
Transportation in St. Landry Parish, Louisiana
Transportation in Evangeline Parish, Louisiana
Transportation in Avoyelles Parish, Louisiana